Pulwama (known as Panwangam in antiquity, and later as Pulgam) is a city and notified area council in the Pulwama district of the Indian union territory of Jammu and Kashmir.

Geography
Average rainfall in the city is 505.3mm annually.

Educational institutions

Boys' Government Degree College Pulwama
Islamic University of Science and Technology Awantipora
Women's College Pulwama
Paramount Institute of Education
Govt. GNM Nursing College Pulwama

Lyceum International School

Greater Pulwama master plan
On 12 February 2021, the government of Jammu and Kashmir approved the constitution of a board for scrutinising and evaluating objections, representations and suggestions by stakeholders concerning a draft master plan for Greater Pulwama 2020–2040.

Smart Town 
Numerous Projects for Smart Town are underway. list of Projects
1. Smart Clock Tower
2. Led Displays
3. New Footpaths 
4. Parking Lots
5. Parks (Children Parks)
6. Segregated House Waste
7. Central Verges
8. High Mast Lights.

Demographics

Per the 2011 Census of India, the city of Pulwama had a population of 18,440 people, with 10,070 males and 8,370 females. Children aged 6 and under numbered 3,167—making up approximately 17.17% of the total population. The female sex ratio of the city is 831, lower than the Jammu and Kashmir state average of 889. Additionally, the child female sex ratio is around 718; also lower than the state average of 862. The literacy rate of Pulwama is 91.18%, significantly higher than the state average of 67.16%. The city is situated in the Kashmir Valley, and the majority of its inhabitants are ethnic Kashmiris.

Religion
The majority of Pulwama's inhabitants are Muslims, comprising 94.59% of the total population, while Hindus comprise the second-largest religious minority at 4.63% of the total population. Other religious minorities in the city include Sikhs (0.34%), Christians (0.17%), Buddhists (0.02%) and Jains (0.01%); 0.24% of the population abstained from declaring their beliefs.

References

Cities and towns in Pulwama district
 
Cities in Jammu and Kashmir